Dras is a hill station in Kargil, Ladakh, Kashmir, India

Dras may also refer to:

 Dras River, Dras Valley, Kargil, Ladakh, Kashmir, India
 Dras, Dras-Leona, Alagaësia; a fictional location in The Inheritance Cycle
 Dras volcanic basalts, rocks found in the Indus-Yarlung suture zone

See also

 
 DRA (disambiguation)
 Drass (disambiguation)